The National Middle School Association (NMSA) is the former name of the Association for Middle Level Education (AMLE), an international education association dedicated exclusively to the middle level grades.

With more than 30,000 members in the United States, Canada, and 46 other countries, AMLE represents principals, teachers, central office personnel, professors, college students, parents, community leaders, and educational consultants. In addition, AMLE's network includes 58 affiliates in the United States, Canada, Europe, and Australia that serve regional, state, provincial, and local needs.

AMLE provides professional development, journals, books, research, and other information to assist educators.

References

Publications 
 Middle School Journal
 Middle Ground
 Research in Middle Level Education Online (RMLE Online)
 Today's Middle Level Educator
 The Family Connection

External links 
 AMLE Web Site
 AMLE Store Web Site
 AMLE Annual Conference & Exhibit Web Site

Teaching in the United States
Education-related professional associations
Educational organizations based in the United States
Professional associations based in the United States